Good Luck Charlie is an American sitcom that originally aired on Disney Channel from April 4, 2010 to February 16, 2014. The series revolves around Teddy Duncan (Bridgit Mendler), a teenage girl who makes video diaries for her little sister Charlie (Mia Talerico) about her family and life as a teenager. The video diaries are made to help Charlie when she grows up. The series also stars Jason Dolley as PJ; Bradley Steven Perry as Gabe; and Leigh-Allyn Baker and Eric Allan Kramer as Amy and Bob Duncan, the children's parents.

Series overview

Episodes

Season 1 (2010–11)

Season 2 (2011)

Film (2011)

Season 3 (2012–13)
On August 29, 2011, Disney Channel renewed Good Luck Charlie for a third season. The third season featured a new addition to the Duncan family. Fans had been given the chance to vote for the name online. On January 30, 2012, Bridgit Mendler tweeted that season three had begun filming. The season premiered on May 6, 2012, with two back-to-back episodes. Both Leigh-Allyn Baker and Eric Allan Kramer each directed an episode this season. The first Christmas episode of the series also aired this season.

Season 4 (2013–14)
On July 12, 2012, Disney Channel renewed Good Luck Charlie for a fourth season. The fourth season premiered on April 28, 2013 with a guest appearance by The Muppets. Logan Moreau guest starred as Toby Duncan throughout the fourth season. Luke Benward also recurred in a six-episode arc this season. Benward and Jason Dolley previously worked together in the 2008 Disney Channel Original Movie Minutemen. Ava Sambora (daughter of Heather Locklear and Richie Sambora) guest starred in the episode "Futuredrama" as an older version of Charlie. It was confirmed on June 11, 2013 that season 4 would be the final season, slated to end on February 16, 2014. On June 20, 2013, it was announced that one of the final episodes of the series would feature a lesbian couple, the first episode of a Disney Channel series to do so.

References 

General references 
 
 
 

Good Luck Charlie
Lists of American sitcom episodes
Lists of American children's television series episodes
Lists of Disney Channel television series episodes